is a video game in the Mega Man Battle Network series for mobile phones developed by Capcom. The game was only released and made available in Japan. It was preceded by Rockman EXE Phantom of Network. The game introduces a new character named , a Netopian.

31 December 2017 was the last day for cellphones to support this game, along with Phantom of Network. On 1 January 2018, the game was removed for Japanese Cellphones, making it more difficult to play.

References

External links
ケータイカプコン：i-mode (Official homepage)
ケータイカプコン：i-mode (Official homepage)

Role-playing video games
Japan-exclusive video games
Legend of Network
Mobile games
Tactical role-playing video games
2006 video games
Video games developed in Japan